Caribou Mines  is a rural community of the Halifax Regional Municipality in the Canadian province of Nova Scotia. The Icelandic settlement Markland was located in Caribou Mines from 1875 to 1882.

References
Caribou Mines on Destination Nova Scotia
Explore HRM
Markland

Communities in Halifax, Nova Scotia
General Service Areas in Nova Scotia